Zeng Yanfen (born January 30, 1991, in Shaoguan, Guangdong, China) is a Chinese idol singer and actress. She was a member of Team NII of SNH48, a Chinese idol girl group in Shanghai, China.

Biography

2013-2015: Early career, debut 
On August 18, 2013, Zeng was selected to be one of the 34 qualified members of the 2nd generation members of SNH48. Later, she formally debuted on the Theater no Megami stage. On November 11, she attended the SNH48 Team establishment flag presentation ceremony, and became a member of Team NII.

On November 16, she attended the SNH48 Guangzhou Concert, and on December 31, she attended Dragon TV 1314 Countdown.

On January 18, 2014, Zeng attended the Red vs White Concert. On February 23, she was among the SNH48 members who participated in the fifth season of China's Got Talent. On May 5, she was invited to attend the release conference of the FM101 Brightness 2014. On July 26, she attended the 2014 General Election Concert. On July 31, she attended the China Joy performance. On December 27, she attended the tour concert named SNH48 China Star-dream.

2015: Rise in SNH48 
On January 15, 2015, the second anniversary EP Give Me Five was issued, and Zeng starred in the music video of the title track. On January 31, she attended the First SNH48 Request Time Best 30 Concert, and performed "Wagamama na Nagareboshi" with Ju Jingyi. On February 17, she attended Jiangsu Television's Spring Festival Gala as one of the 48 members of SNH48. On July 25, she attended the 2015 General Election Concert, and was awarded 9th place. On August 11, she won first place in the Style-7 vote hosted by Le TV. On September 25, she attended the Echo App Stars’ Night Show with Team NII, and became the first generation of spokesman for Echo. On October 31, she attended Style-7's first fashion show, and won fourth place. On November 10, she attended the Tmall Double-11 Evening Party hosted by Hunan Television. On December 4, the variety show she attended, named Assaulting Girls, was broadcast. On December 26, she attended the Second SNH48 Request Time Best 30 Concert. On December 31, she attended Jiangsu Television Countdown Concert.

On January 11, 2016, the SNH48 Theater Annual MVPs were announced. Zeng was awarded the Theater MVP, and she became the first member who won this honor three times in a row. On 30 July 2016, during SNH48's third General Election, Zeng was ranked fourth with 88,656.8 votes.

On 7 January 2017, she participated in SNH48's third Request Time, of which her song "Don't Touch", performed with Ju Jingyi and Zhao Yue, came in first. On February 10, she guest-starred on the variety show Lonely Room. On March 3, she was awarded the Annual Theater MVP for the year 2016, the fourth time in a row. On July 29, during SNH48's fourth General Election, Zeng came in sixth with 111145.9 votes.

Discography

With SNH48

EPs

Units

Stage units

Concert units

Filmography

Movies

TV series

Variety shows

References

External links
 Official Member Profile
 
 Zeng Yanfen's Website (Archived) 
 Zeng Yanfen on DouyuTV

1991 births
Living people
SNH48 members
Chinese Mandopop singers
Chinese film actresses
Chinese television actresses
21st-century Chinese actresses
People from Shaoguan
Singers from Guangdong
Actresses from Guangdong
Hakka musicians